The Timoleague and Courtmacsherry Railway was a  long light railway connecting Timoleague station and Courtmacsherry station. It was the last roadside railway operating in Ireland.

History
The railway was incorporated in October 1888 and opened on 21 April 1891. It was originally considered to be built as a  narrow gauge track but then executed as a standard gauge light railway, partly running along a road. There were two companies, the Timoleague & Courtmacsherry Light Railway and the Ballinascarthy & Timoleague Junction Light Railway which were both worked by the Timoleague & Courtmacsherry Extension Light Railway. It became a constituent of Great Southern Railways in 1925. It was originally operated by two locomotives, both from the Leeds works of the Hunslet Engine Company, named Slaney and St. Molaga. These two were joined in 1894 by a third locomotive, again from Hunslet, with the name Argadeen.

Passenger services were withdrawn on 24 February 1947 due to the coal shortages. Thereafter it operated only for summer excursions and the winter beet harvest. Summer passenger excursions operated every Sunday from Cork Albert Quay railway station and they were well supported from the small stations on route. The pace at which the trains rounded the sharp curves of the roadside track contributed to the atmosphere for which these excursions were renowned. The entire West Cork Railway terminated without warning in the autumn of 1960.

Gallery

References

External links

Defunct railway companies of Ireland
Transport in County Cork
Railway companies disestablished in 1960
Closed railways in Ireland
Railway lines opened in 1891
Railway lines closed in 1960